Mohanpur may refer to:

India

Bihar
Mohanpur, Darbhanga, a village in Darbhanga district
Mohanpur, Begusarai, a village in Begusarai district
Mohanpur, Saharsa, a village in Saharsa 
Mohanpur, Madhubani, a village in Madhubani

Punjab
Mohanpur, Ludhiana, a village in Ludhiana district
Mohanpur, Tarn Taran, a city in Tarn Taran district

West Bengal
 Mohanpur, Paschim Medinipur, a village, with a police station, in Paschim Medinipur district
Mohanpur (community development block), a division in West Midnapore district
Mohanpur, Nadia, a village in Nadia district
Mohanpur, North 24 Parganas, a census town in North 24 Parganas district
Mohanpur, Diamond Harbour, a census town in South 24 Parganas district
Mohanpur, Jhargram, a village in Jhargram district

Other states
Mohanpur, Rewari, a village in Bawal Tehsil in Rewari district, Haryana 
Mohanpur, Deoghar, a community development block in Deoghar district, Jharkhand
Mohanpur, Khiron, a village in Raebareli district, Uttar Pradesh
Mohanpur, Uttar Pradesh, a town in Etah district, Uttar Pradesh
Mohanpur State, a princely state under the Mahi Kantha Agency, Gujarat
Mohanpur, Tripura

Nepal
Mohanpur, Sarlahi, a village in the southeast
Mohanpur, Saptari, a village in the southeast

Bangladesh
Mohanpur Upazila, Rajshahi District

See also
Mohanpur Mohammadpur, a town in Hardwar district, Uttarakhand, India